Aris Thessaloniki competed in the Super League. They started their Greek campaign after finishing 13th in last season's league and will enter the Greek Football Cup in the fourth round. 

After the elections in Aris Members' Society, a new chairman, Dimitris Iliadis was appointed with the hope to face club's serious financial problems. Due to lack of appropriate licence from the Hellenic Football Federation Aris for the 2013–14 season could only sign three players being above 24 years old. Dimitris Iliadis resigned in December after the rumors that there was interest from an investor. Old president Lampros Skordas returned temporarily as president and eventually stayed until the end of the season.

About the manager, Aris Thessaloniki started the season with Giannis Chatzinikolaou. After the three defeats in the first three league games Giannis Chatzinikolaou left and was replaced by serbian Zoran Milinković. Along with the change of president, the team also changed its manager. Soulis Papadopoulos arrived in December. With confirmation of relegation Soulis Papadopoulos resigned. The season finished with Foris Kakoglou as manager and Giorgos Foiros, Dimitris Bougiouklis and Nikos Papadopoulos as assistants

First-team squad

Transfers and loans

Transfers in

Transfers out

Loans in

Staff

Competitions

Overall

Overview

{| class="wikitable" style="text-align: center"
|-
!rowspan=2|Competition
!colspan=8|Record
|-
!
!
!
!
!
!
!
!
|-
| Super League

|-
| Greek Football Cup

|-
! Total

Friendly matches

Super League

League table

Results summary

Results by matchday

Matches

Greek Football Cup

All the 18 teams of Super League entered in the Round of 32

Round of 32

Player statistics

Appearances

Goals

Assists

Kit

|
|
|
|
|

References

External links
 Aris Thessaloniki F.C. official website
 Aris Thessaloniki FC on Superleaguegreece.net

2013-14
Greek football clubs 2013–14 season